Boise River Wildlife Management Area at  is an Idaho wildlife management area in Ada, Boise, and Elmore counties east of Boise. The WMA is located on land around Lucky Peak Lake, a reservoir on formed by the Lucky Peak Dam on the Boise River. The WMA is managed by the Idaho Department of Fish and Game (IDFG) but consists of land owned by IDFG, the Bureau of Land Management, U.S. Forest Service, Army Corps of Engineers, and Idaho Fish and Wildlife Foundation. The first land for the WMA was purchased in 1943, and the mission of the WMA is to conserve mule deer and elk wintering habitat.

Lower elevations of the WMA support sagebrush steppe, while higher elevations have Ponderosa pine and Douglas fir. During the winter there are typically 7,000 mule deer and 500 elk in the WMA.

References

Protected areas established in 1943
Protected areas of Ada County, Idaho
Protected areas of Boise County, Idaho
Protected areas of Elmore County, Idaho
Wildlife management areas of Idaho
1943 establishments in Idaho